WRAS may mean:

 WRAS (FM) 88.5 radio at Georgia State University in Atlanta, Georgia, United States
 Water Regulations Advisory Scheme conformance mark in the United Kingdom